Deglur taluka is a taluka in Nanded district of Maharashtra an Indian state.

Nanded district
There were 18 talukas in Nanded district as of November 2018, viz. Nanded, Ardhapur, Bhokar, Biloli, Deglur, Dharmabad, Hadgaon,  Himayatnagar, Kandhar, Kinwat, Loha, Mahur, Mudkhed, Mukhed, Naigaon, and Umri. In 1981, there were eight talukas in the district, viz. Nanded, Hadgaon, Kinwat, Bhokar, Biloli, Deglur (Degloor), Mukhed and Kandhar.

References

Talukas in Nanded district